Plesná is a town in Cheb District in the Karlovy Vary Region of the Czech Republic. It has about 1,900 inhabitants.

Administrative parts
Villages of Lomnička, Smrčina and Vackov are administrative parts of Plesná.

Geography
It lies on the border with Germany, in the Fichtel Mountains. The Plesná River flows through the town.

History
The first written mention of Plesná is from 1185, when it belonged to Waldsassen Abbey. In 1900, Plesná became a town.

Transport
There is the road border crossing Plesná / Bad Brambach and railway border crossing Vojtanov / Bad Brambach.

Sights
There are ruins of Neuhaus castle located in the southern part of the territory. It could be a mansion of ministeriales of Plesná mentioned in 1197, but according to another source, it is a different mansion of unknown origin.

Notable people
Isaac Mayer Wise (1819–1900), American Reform rabbi
František Nedvěd (1950–2010), weightlifter

Twin towns – sister cities

Plesná is twinned with:
 Bad Brambach, Germany
 Eichenzell, Germany
 Erbendorf, Germany
 Rosenthal am Rennsteig, Germany

Gallery

References

External links

Cities and towns in the Czech Republic
Populated places in Cheb District
Czech Republic–Germany border crossings